The National Community Association is a social-liberal and nationalist political party in Vanuatu established in May 1996. 
At the elections held on 6 July 2004, the party won 2 out of 52 seats.

Political parties in Vanuatu